Maria Trebunia (born 3 May 1956) is a Polish cross-country skier. She competed in three events at the 1976 Winter Olympics.

Cross-country skiing results

Olympic Games

References

External links
 

1956 births
Living people
Polish female cross-country skiers
Olympic cross-country skiers of Poland
Cross-country skiers at the 1976 Winter Olympics
People from Tatra County